Photochrom, Fotochrom, Photochrome or the Aäc process is a process for producing colorized images from a single black-and-white photographic negative via the direct photographic transfer of the negative onto lithographic printing plates. The process is a photographic variant of  chromolithography (color lithography). Because no color information was preserved in the photographic process, the photographer would make detailed notes on the colors within the scene and use the notes to hand paint the negative before transferring the image through colored gels onto the printing plates.

History
The process was invented in the 1880s by Hans Jakob Schmid (1856–1924), an employee of the Swiss company Orell Gessner Füssli—a printing firm whose history began in the 16th century. Füssli founded the stock company Photochrom Zürich (later Photoglob Zürich AG) as the business vehicle for the commercial exploitation of the process and both Füssli and Photoglob continue to exist today. From the mid-1890s the process was licensed by other companies, including the Detroit Photographic Company in the US (making it the basis of their "phostint" process), and the Photochrom Company of London.

Amongst the first commercial photographers to employ the technique were French photographer Félix Bonfils, British photographer Francis Frith and American photographer William Henry Jackson, all active in the 1880s.  The photochrom process was most popular in the 1890s, when true color photography was first developed but was still commercially impractical.

In 1898 the US Congress passed the Private Mailing Card Act which let private publishers produce postcards. These could be mailed for one cent each, while the letter rate was two cents. Publishers created thousands of photochrom prints, usually of cities or landscapes, and sold them as postcards. In this format, photochrom reproductions became popular. The Detroit Photographic Company reportedly produced as many as seven million photochrom prints in some years, and ten to thirty thousand different views were offered.

After World War I, which ended the craze for collecting photochrom postcards, the chief use of the process was for posters and art reproductions. The last photochrom printer operated up to 1970.

Process
A tablet of lithographic limestone called a "litho stone" was coated with a light-sensitive surface composed of a thin layer of purified bitumen dissolved in benzene. A reversed halftone negative was hand colored according to the sketch and notes taken at the scene, then pressed against the coating and exposed to daylight through gel filters, causing the bitumen to harden in proportion to the amount of light passing through each portion of the negative. This would take ten to thirty minutes in summer and up to several hours in winter. A solvent such as turpentine was applied to remove the unhardened bitumen. The plate would be retouched to adjust the tonal scale, strengthening or softening tones as required. The image became imprinted on the stone in bitumen. Each tint was applied using a separate stone that bore the appropriate retouched image. The finished print was produced using at least six, but more commonly ten to fifteen, tint stones.

Gallery

Notes

References

External links

https://photochrome.us/description-and-provenance/
Description of the Photochrom process
The Library of Congress Public Domain Photochrom Prints Search
Search at the Zurich Central Library (holds probably world's largest collection:  of their  prints are accessible online)
 Detroit Photographic Company’s Views of North America, ca. 1897–1924 from the Beinecke Rare Book & Manuscript Library

Photographic techniques
Postcards
Printing
Swiss inventions